The Mangere by-election of 1977 was a by-election for the electorate of Mangere on 26 March 1977 during the 38th New Zealand Parliament. The by-election resulted from the resignation of the previous member Colin Moyle after accusations against him in parliament, and he was replaced by David Lange, also of the Labour Party. Apart from Lange, there were seven other candidates in the by-election.

Candidates

Labour
Initially, there was media supposition that Moyle would stand again to vindicate himself from Muldoon's allegations and that he would not be opposed for selection. However several people did nominate though they were without name recognition. As Mangere was a safe Labour seat, there was a large amount of interest. Eventually there were four former Labour MPs in the race and Moyle decided to withdraw his nomination on 12 February only three days before the selection meeting. This led Labour's Auckland President Barry Gustafson to call for nominations to be re-opened, however Labour Party general secretary John Wybrow refused. With Moyle out, former MPs Dorothy Jelicich and Mike Moore became the favourites, with both Moyle and Labour leader Bill Rowling supporting Jelicich.

In the end a mammoth total of 16 candidates were nominated:

Gerrard Beeson, former Mayor of Onehunga
Brian Edwards, a Manukau City Councillor
Kelly Flavell, local lawyer
Ken Hastings, Secretary of Labour's Auckland Regional Council
George Hawkins, Chairman of the  branch
Harriet Hussey, Secretary of the Grey Lynn branch
Dorothy Jelicich, former MP for 
Nigel Mercer, Chairman of the  branch
Mike Moore, former MP for 
Brian Nicholson, member of the Manukau East branch
Ian Shaw, Secretary of the Riverside branch
Elsa Smith, Chair of the Grey Lynn women's branch
Charles Turner, Chairman of the  branch

The candidates were narrowed down to a shortlist three Jelicich, Lange and Moore. The local members preferred Moore whilst the Labour Party head office favoured Jelicich resulting in Lange being selected as a compromise candidate. Lange, a criminal defence lawyer, was relatively unknown in political circles and his selection was something of a surprise.

National
Four candidates sought the National Party nomination:

Colin Bidois, a sports shop proprietor and Manukau City Councillor since 1968
Stanley Lawson, a book retail manager and member of the Auckland Power Board, National's  candidate in 1972 and 1975
Clem Simich, a builder and former police detective-sergeant, deputy chairman of National's  executive
Brian Slater, a pilot and Waitemata City Councillor, former vice-chair of National's  executive (1964–1967)

Simich won the selection. Simich was noted as being well presented but misjudging the nature of the Mangere electorate. His policies were largely conservative and he drove around in a Rolls-Royce followed by several other glamorous cars in a motorcade which jarred with the lower-middle class nature of the locals.

Others
The incipient Values Party chose their 1975 candidate Frank Grayson once again. Bill Owens was the candidate for the Social Credit Party who had contested the Mangere seat in 1975. Barry Shaw ran as an independent labour candidate and Brigid Mulrennan stood for the Socialist Action Party, both had contested  in 1975.

Campaign
Most of the campaigning was conducted by candidates hosting public meetings, most of which were well attended. Labour leader Bill Rowling spoke at several meetings in Lange's support as did several other MPs. In one noted occasion a heckler at a workplace meeting was chased across a nearby paddock by  MP Mick Connelly. There was also a live televised debate between Lange and Simich which, despite being a local contest, was broadcast nationwide. Lange performed well and won the debate, giving him much publicity on the national stage.

Results
The following table gives the election results:

Aftermath
The by-election put Lange into parliament, and the attention that he got helped propel him to the deputy leadership of the parliamentary Labour Party in 1979 and the leadership itself in February 1983, and then a landslide victory over Muldoon in the 1984 general election. As Labour's majority was larger than expected Lange spent most of his first few weeks as an MP supporting Labour's candidate in the 1977 Pahiatua by-election, Allan Levett, attempt to increase their vote share.

Notes

References

Mangere 1977
1977 elections in New Zealand
Politics of the Auckland Region
March 1977 events in New Zealand